The Day of the Crows is a 2012 French-language traditionally animated fantasy film directed by Jean-Christophe Dessaint from a screenplay by Amandine Taffin, based on the eponymous 2004 novel by Québécois writer Jean-François Beauchemin. An international co-production with France, Luxemburg, Belgium and Canada, the film was produced by Finalement, Walking the Dog, Mélusine Productions, Max Films and uFilm. The Day of the Crows was released in Quebec, Canada on 19 October 2012, and in France and Belgium on 24 October.

Premise 
Courge lives deep in a magical forest haunted by spirits, raised by his father Courge, a giant who prevents him from exploring the outside world. One day, he is forced to go to the nearest village, where he meets the young girl Manon.

Voice cast 
The French voice cast is as follows:
Lorànt Deutsch as Courge
Jean Reno as Courge's father
Isabelle Carré as Manon
Claude Chabrol as the doctor
Chantal Neuwirth as the old Bramble
Bruno Podalydès as the nurse
Philippe Uchan as the mayor

Production 
The Day of the Crows was announced on 19 October 2008, with Serge Elissalde originally set to direct. By March 2011, it was announced that Jean-Christophe Dessaint would direct the film. The soundtrack was composed by Simon Leclerc, and signed to Milan Records.

Release 
The Day of the Crows was released in Québécois cinemas on 19 October 2012 by Remstar, and in France and Belgium on 24 October by Gébéka Films and uDream respectively. In France, it grossed $336,144 from 186 theatres, and in Belgium The Day of the Crows grossed $4,923 in its opening week for a total gross of $50,539 fron nine theatres. On 19 September 2013, it was released in Russia, Ukraine and in some Commonwealth of Independent States countries by Magna Tech Russia. Released in 132 theatres, it grossed $86,421, contributing to its worldwide box office gross of $473,104.

References

External links 

2012 animated films
2010s Canadian films
2010s Canadian animated films
2010s French films
2010s French animated films
Canadian children's animated films
French children's films
Luxembourgian animated films
French-language Belgian films
French-language Canadian films
French-language Luxembourgian films